Issa or Isa is a given name and surname that means Jesus in Arabic. It may refer to:

Jesus in Islam
El-Issa family
Issa (clan), a Somali clan that mainly inhabits Djibouti

Mononym 
Jane Siberry (born 1955), Canadian singer who released several albums under the name Issa
Issa (Senegalese singer), Issa Diop, singer, songwriter, and record producer
Issa, the nickname of Luttif Afif, a leader of the Black September terror squad at the 1972 Olympic Games

Given name 
Issa Amro (born 1980), Palestinian activist
Issa Bagayogo (1961–2016), Malian musician
Issa Boulos (born 1968), Palestinian-American oud player, composer, lyricist, researcher and educator
Issa Cissokho, Senegalese musician of Malian griot roots, a composer, and saxophone player for Orchestra Baobab
Issa Cissokho (footballer) (born 1985), Senegalese footballer
Issa Diop (footballer) (born 1997), French footballer 
Issa Gold (born 1990), American rapper 
Issa Hayatou (born 1946), Cameroonian athlete and sports executive
, lead singer of J-pop band Da Pump
Issa Kassissieh (born 1964), Palestinian scholar and diplomat
Issa Kallon (born 1996), Dutch footballer
, Japanese haiku poet
Issa Lish (born 1995), Mexican model
Issa López, Mexican writer and director
Issa Michuzi, Tanzanian photojournalist
Issa Mohamed (cyclist) (born 1965), Emirati cyclist
Issa Mohamed (swimmer) (born 1995), Kenyan swimmer
Isa Ali Abdullah al Murbati (born 1965), Guantanamo Bay detainee
Issa Ndoye (born 1985), Senegalese footballer 
Issa-Aimé Nthépé (born 1973), French sprinter
Issa Pliyev (1903–1979), Soviet military commander, Army General, twice Hero of the Soviet Union
Issa Pointer (born 1978), American singer and member of the vocal group The Pointer Sisters
Issa Rae (born 1985), American actress
Issa Rayyan (born 2000), American soccer player
Issa Samb (1945–2017), aka Joe Ouakam, Senegalese painter, sculptor, performance artist, playwright and poet
Issa Samba (born 1998), French footballer 
Issa Sarr (born 1986), Senegalese footballer
Issa Schultz (born 1984), English Australian radio and television quiz personality
Issa Sesay (born 1970), military leader in the Sierra Leone insurgency
Issa G. Shivji (born 1946), Tanzanian author and academic
Issa Tchiroma (born 1949), Cameroonian politician and minister
Issa Thiaw (born 1992), Senegalese footballer
Issa Timamy (born 1959), Kenyan politician
Issa Twaimz, American YouTuber and musician
Issah Yakubu (born 1992), Ghanaian footballer
Issa bin Zayed Al Nahyan, UAE Sheikh and torturer

Middle name 
Falaba Issa Traoré (1930–2003), Malian writer, comedian, playwright, and theatre and film director

Surname 
Abdul Razzaq al-Issa (born 1949), Iraqi politician and minister
Abeer Issa (born 1961), Jordanian actress
Abraham Elias Issa (1905–1984), Jamaican businessman, entrepreneur and hotelier 
Aguila Saleh Issa (born 1944), Libyan jurist and politician, President of the Libyan House of Representatives
Daniel Issa (born 1952), American politician 
Darrell Issa (born 1953), American politician and Californian Representative
Dounia Issa (born 1981), French basketball player
Farouk Abu Issa (born 1933), Sudanese politician and minister
Issa Abu Issa (born 1955), Qatari business magnate
Issa El-Issa (1878–1950), Palestinian Christian poet and journalist
Issa Issa (born 1984), or Issam Al-Edrissi, Lebanese footballer
Issa Kassim Issa (born 1957), Tanzanian politician
Jabari Issa (born 1978), American football player 
Joseph John Issa (born 1965), known as Joe or Joey Issa, Jamaican businessman and philanthropist
Leandro Issa (born 1983), Brazilian mixed martial artist
Majida Issa (born 1981), Colombian actress and singer
Marwan Issa (born 1965), Palestinian militant and leader of Hamas' military wing, the Izz ad-Din al-Qassam Brigade
Mohamed ben Issa or al-Hadi ben Issa (also nicknamed Sheikh al-Kamil; 1467–1526), Moroccan Wali and founder of the Triqa Issawiya, considered the patron-saint of the city of Meknes
Mohsin Issa (born 1971), and Zuber Issa, British billionaire businessmen, co-founders of Euro Garages
Muhammad bin Abdul Karim Issa (born 1965), Saudi Arabian politician, Secretary General of the Muslim World League
Norman Issa (born 1967), Israeli Arab actor, active in cinema, theatre and television
Pierre Issa (born 1975), South African footballer
Raja El-Issa (1922–2008), Palestinian journalist
Salomon Juan Marcos Issa (born 1948), Mexican politician
Tariq Issa (born 1997), English footballer 
Tatiana Issa (born 1974), Brazilian director and producer
Yousef El-Issa (1870–1948), Palestinian journalist

Fictional characters
, a character from Animal Yokochō
, a character from Dragon Eye
, a character from Yowamushi Pedal

Other uses
Issa, another name for the Native American Catawba people
Tropical Storm Isa, name used for multiple tropical cyclones worldwide

Unisex given names
Surnames of Nigerien origin